Ralph A. Garzia (May 30, 1921 – January 14, 2009) was an American politician who served as a Democratic member of the Pennsylvania House of Representatives, 160th district from 1975 to 1978.  He was also on the city council and mayor of the borough of Brookhaven, Pennsylvania.

Early life and education
Garzia was born in Marcus Hook, Pennsylvania and graduated from Eddystone High School in 1940. He joined the United States Army in July 1942 and served as a military police officer in the Rhineland and Central Europe during World War II. He worked as a realtor and an equipment operator at the BP Oil Corporation refinery.

Career
Garzia was elected to the Pennsylvania House of Representatives for the 1975 and 1977 terms. He lost to Kathrynann Durham in 1979 and had unsuccessful campaigns for reelection in 1981 and 1987.

Garzia was elected to the city council and as mayor of the borough of Brookhaven, Pennsylvania.

Personal life
Garzia is interred at the Immaculate Heart of Mary Catholic Cemetery in Linwood, Pennsylvania.

References

1921 births
2009 deaths
American military police officers
Democratic Party members of the Pennsylvania House of Representatives
20th-century American politicians
People from Marcus Hook, Pennsylvania
United States Army soldiers
United States Army personnel of World War II